Nondescripts Cricket Club (also known by its initials NCC) is a first-class cricket team based in Colombo, Sri Lanka. The team plays at the Nondescripts Cricket Club Ground.

History
The club was founded in 1888. The name "Nondescripts" is derived from the fact it was intended to be open to anyone, unlike other Colombo-based clubs at the time such as Sinhalese Sports Club, Moors Sports Club and Tamil Union Cricket & Athletic Club which were aligned with a particular ethnic group.

Honours
 P Saravanamuttu Trophy/Robert Senanayake Trophy/Lakspray Trophy/Premier Trophy (16) 
1952–53, 
1953–54, 
1954–55, 
1956–57, 
1957–58, 
1960–61, 
1969–70, 
1970–71, 
1975–76,
1976–77, 
1978–79,
1985–86, 
1988–89,
1993–94,
2000–01,
2013–14

 Under 23 Trophy (2) 
2008–09 
2009–10

Current squad

Players with international caps are listed in bold. (Updated as of 24 July 2022)

Team records
 Highest team total – 538 vs Sinhalese Sports Club
 Best innings bowling figures – Lyndon Hannibal 8/38 vs MSC
 Hundred in first match – Prasad Padmasanka 106 vs PSC
 Hundred in each innings – Pradeep Hewage 168 & 123 vs Matara
 Highest individual score – Aravinda De Silva 222 vs SCC
 Partnership records –
 1 – 233 RP Arnold & S Weerasinghe
 2 – 226 RP Arnold & MN Nawaz
 3 – 143 MN Nawaz & PA de Silva
 4 – 285 HP Tillakaratne & CP Mapatuna
 5 – 234* RP Arnold & CP Mapatuna
 6 – 239* DA Gunawardene & HP Tillakaratne
 7 – 153 PA de Silva & AGD Wickremasinghe
 8 – 147* RS Kalpage & MTT Mirando
 9 – 130  HP Tillakaratne & KR Pushpakumara
 10 – 62  RS Kalpage & WS Sirimanne

Other Nondescripts clubs 
The name 'Nondescripts Cricket Club' derives from a 19th-century London-based team.  The Nondescripts were a 'wandering' cricket club with no fixed ground and a team composed of players of all standards.  A New Zealand Nondescripts Club was established in 1962 to promote "the principles of the game of Cricket, especially sportsmanship and high standards in dress, attitude and application."  It too is a 'wandering' club drawn mainly from Wellington and Lower Hutt players; eight NZ internationals have played for the club, including Ewen Chatfield, John Reid and Bob Blair. In the 1980s, a Nondescripts Cricket Club played in the Brunei cricket league. Consisting largely of Sri Lankan expatriates, both Sinhalese and Tamil, it later merged with another club and changed its name.

Notable players

Players who have represented Ceylon in cricket

Players to have represented Sri Lanka at Test cricket
 

 Rumesh Ratnayake
 Russel Arnold
 Upul Chandana
 Dinesh Chandimal
 Aravinda de Silva
 Niroshan Dickwella
 Avishka Gunawardene
 Ranjan Madugalle
 Lasith Malinga
 Naveed Nawaz
 Ravindra Pushpakumara
 Kumar Sangakkara
 Upul Tharanga
 Hashan Tillakaratne
 Gamini Wickremasinghe
 Farveez Maharoof

References

External links
 Brief history of Nondescripts Cricket Club
 Cricinfo
 Nondescripts Cricket Club at CricketArchive
 Nondescripts Cricket Club at Sri Lanka Cricket

Sri Lankan first-class cricket teams
1888 establishments
1888 establishments in Ceylon